The sponges of Venezuela are a part of the Porifera fauna of Venezuela (which is part of the wildlife of Venezuela). 

A number of species of sponges are found in the wild in Venezuela. 

This is a partial list of the marine and freshwater sponges of Venezuela. The families are listed alphabetically within the classes.

Statistics

Marine sponges

Family Acarnidae

 Acarnus 

Family Adociidae
 Sigmadocia caerulea Hechtel 1965

Family Aplysinidae
 Aplysina archeri (Higgin, 1875) 
 Aplysina caissara Pinheiro & Hajdu, 2001
 Aplysina cauliformis (Carter, 1882) 
 Aplysina fistularis  (Pallas, 1766)
 Aplysina fulva (Pallas, 1766)
 Aplysina lacunosa (Lamarck, 1814)

Family Callyspongiidae
 Callyspongia arcesiosa  Laubenfels, 1936
 Callyspongia vaginalis (Lamarck, 1814)

Family Chalinidae
 Chalinula molitba   (Laubenfels, 1949)
 
Family Chondrillidae
 Chondrilla caribensis  Rützler, Duran & Piantoni, 2007
 Chondrilla nucula Smithdt 1862

Family Clionidae
 Cliona raphida Boury-Esnault, 1973
 Cliona varians  (Duchassaing & Michelotti, 1864)

Family Coelosphaeridae
 Lissodendoryx 

Family Crambeidae
 Monanchora arbuscula  (Duchassaing & Michelotti, 1864)
 
Family Darwinellidae
 Aplysilla glacialis  (Merejkowski, 1878)
 Chelonaplysilla erecta Tsurnamal, 1967
 Darwinella rosacea Hechtel, 1965

Family Desmacididae
 Desmapsamma anchorata (Carter, 1882)

Family Desmacidonidae
 Liosina monticulosa (Verrill, 1907)

Family Dysidea
 Dysidea etheria Laubenfels, 1936 

Family Dictyonellidae
 Scopalina ruetzleri (Wiedenmayer, 1977) 

Family Dysideidae
 Dysidea etheria Laubenfels, 1936

Family Geodiidae
 Geodia gibberosa Lamarck, 1815
 Geodia papyracea Hechtel, 1965

Family Grantiidae
 Leucandra aspera (Schmidt, 1862)  

Family Halichondriidae
 Anthosigmella varians (Duchassaing & Michelotti, 1864)
 Halichondria magniculosa Hechtel
 Halichondria melanadocia Laubenfels, 1936
 Topsentia ophiraphidites  (Laubenfels, 1934)

Family Halicloniidae
 Haliclona caerulea (Hechtel, 1965)
 Haliclona crassiloba Laubenfels, 1950
 Haliclona curacaoensis (van Soest, 1980)
 Haliclona doria Laubenfels, 1936
 Haliclona implexiformis (Hechtel, 1965)
 Haliclona magnifica  de Weerdt, Rützler & Smith, 1991
 Haliclona manglaris Alcolado, 1984
 Haliclona permollis (Bowerbank, 1866)
 Haliclona picadaerensis
 Haliclona tubifera (George & Wilson, 1919) 
 Haliclona twincayensis de Weerdt, Rützler & Smith, 1991 
 Haliclona viridis (Keller, 1889) 
 Niphastes variabilis Duchassaing & Michelotti, 1864

Family Halisarcidae
 Halisarca

Family Heteroxyidae
 Myrmekioderma rea (de Laubenfels, 1934)

Family Hymedesmiidae
 Phorbas amaranthus Duchassaing & Michelotti, 1864 

Family Iotrochotidae
 Iotrochota birotulata (Higgin, 1877)

Family Irciniidae
 Irsinia fasciculata (Pallas, 1766)
 Ircinia felix (Duchassaing & Michelotti, 1864)
 Irsinia strobilina (Lamarck, 1816)

Family Microcionidae
 Artemisina melana  van Soest, 1984 
 Clathria ferrea  (de Laubenfels, 1936) 
 Clathria venosa Hooper, 1996 
 Clathria microchela (Stephens, 1916)
 Clathria schoenus  (Laubenfels, 1936)
 Clathria venosa (Alcolado, 1984)
 Microciona  
 Pandaros acanthifolium Duchassaing & Michelotti, 1864 

Family Mycalidae
 Ulosa hispida Hechtel, 1965
 Mycale americana  van Soest, 1984
 Mycale angulosa (Duchassaing & Michelotti, 1864)
 Mycale carmigropila Hajdu & Rützler, 1998
 Mycale citrina Hajdu & Rützler, 1998 
 Mycale laxissima  (Duchassaing & Michelotti, 1864) 
 Mycale magnirhaphidifera van Soest, 1984
 Mycale microsigmatosa Arndt, 1927 

Family Niphatidae
 Amphimedon compressa  Duchassaing & Michelotti, 1864 
 Amphimedon viridis  Duchassaing & Michelotti, 1864 
 Gelliodes ramosa Kieschnick, 1898
 Neopetrosia subtriangularis  (Duchassaing, 1850) 
 Niphates erecta Duchassaing & Michelotti, 1864 

Family Ophlitaspongiidae
 Biemna caribea Pulitzer-Finali, 1986 
 Biemna microstyla Laubenfels, 1950  
 Desmacella jania Verrill, 1907
 Desmacella meliorata  Wiedenmayer, 1977

Family Petrosiidae
 Neopetrosia subtriangularis  (Duchassaing, 1850) 

Family Phloeodictyidae
 Oceanapia nodosa   (George & Wilson, 1919) 

Family Placospongiidae
 Placospongia intermedia Sollas, 1888 

Family Spirastrellidae
 Desmacella jania

Family Spongiidae

 Spongia pertusa Hyatt, 1877
 Spongia officinalis Linnaeus, 1759
 Spongia tubulifera Lamarck, 1814
 Spongia zimocca Schmidt, 1862

Family Suberitidae
 Prosuberites laughlini  (Díaz, Álvarez & van Soest, 1987)
 Suberites aurantiacus   (Duchassaing & Michelotti, 1864)
 Terpios fugax  Duchassaing & Michelotti, 1864 
 Terpios zeteki Laubenfels 1936
 Terpios manglaris  Rützler & Smith, 1993 

Family Sycettidae
 Sycon

Family Tethyidae
 Tethya actinia  de Laubenfels, 1950  
 Tethya seychellensis (Wright, 1881) 

Family Tedaniide
 Tedania ignis (Duchassaing & Michelotti 1864)
 Lissodendoryx isodictyalis (Carter, 1882)

Family Tetillidae
 Cinachyrella apion  (Uliczka, 1929) 
 Cinachyrella kuekenthali (Uliczka, 1929) 
 Cinachyrella tarentina  (Pulitzer-Finali, 1983) 

Family Thorectidae
 Hyrtios proteus' Duchassaing & Michelotti, 1864 
 Hyrtios violaceus (Duchassaing & Michelotti 1864)

Freshwater sponges
Family Metaniidae 
 Acalle recurvata (Bowerbank, 1863)  
 Drulia browni (Bowerbank, 1863) 
 Drulia conifera Boneto & Ezcurra de Drago, 1973
 Drulia cristata (Weltner, 1895)
 Drulia uruguayensis Boneto & Ezcurra de Drago, 1968
 Metania reticulata (Bowerbank, 1863)

Family Potamolepidae
 Onosclera intermedia (Boneto & Ezcurra de Drago, 1973)
 Onosclera navicella (Carter, 1881)
 Onosclera spinifera (Boneto & Ezcurra de Drago, 1973)
 Uruguaya corallioides (Bowerbank, 1863)

Family Spongillidae
 Corvoheteromeyenia heterosclera (Ezcurra de drago, 1974)
 Saturnospongilla carvalhoi Volkmer-Rivero, 1976
 Spongilla alba Carter, 1849
 Pottsiela spoliata Volkmer-Rivero & Maciel, 1983
 Trochospongilla gregaria (Bowerbank, 1863)
 Trochospongilla minuta (Postt, 1887)
 Trochospongilla paulula'' (Bowerbank, 1863)

See also
 List of echinoderms of Venezuela
 List of introduced molluscs of Venezuela
 List of marine molluscs of Venezuela
 List of molluscs of Falcón state, Venezuela
 List of non-marine molluscs of El Hatillo Municipality, Miranda, Venezuela
 List of non-marine molluscs of Venezuela
 List of birds of Venezuela
 List of mammals of Venezuela

References

Other references
 Álvarez, A. I. 1989. Establecimiento, desarrollo y mantenimiento de una comunidad epibentónica tropical. [Settlement, Development and Maintenance of a Tropical Epibenthic Community.] Licenciate’s Thesis, Universidad Central de Venezuela, Caracas, Venezuela.
 Diaz, M. C., S. Pauls, E. Villamizar, A. Alvizu, M. E. Amaro, M. Cellamare, S. Grune, I. Hernández, S. Narciso, A. Pérez, J. Pérez, I. Ramírez, R. Ramos, M. P. Romero, and P. Young. 2003. Porifera Biodiversity in Nueva Esparta, Venezuela: Common Species from La Restinga and Cabugua Island. Abstract. The Twin Cays Mangrove Ecosystem, Belize: Biodiversity, Geological History, and Two Decades of  Change. Report from a Workshop, Smithsonian Marine Station, Fort Pierce, Florida, December 2003. Washington, D.C.: Smithsonian Institution.
 Pauls, S. 1998. Estudio Sistemático y Biodiversidad de Porifera y Cnidaria en la Bahía de la P. N. Henri Pittier. [Systematic and Diversity Study of Porifera and Cnidaria of the Ciénaga de Ocumare de la Costa Bay, Henri Pittier National Park.] Caracas: Escuela de Biología, Universidad Central de Venezuela.
 Pauls, S. 2003. “Esponjas.” In Biodiversidad en Venezuela. [“Sponges.”In Biodiversity of Venezuela.], ed. M. Aguilera, A. Azocar, and E. Gonzales, pp. 210– 219. Caracas, Venezuela: Polar Foundation and Ministry of Science and Technology.
 Pérez, A. 2007. Biodiversidad y Estructura Comunitaria de Poriferos Asociados a Raíces del Manglar, Rhizophora mangle, en el P. N. Laguna de La Restinga, Nueva Esparta, Venezuela. [Biodiversity and Community Structure of Porifers Associated to Mangrove Roots, Rizophora mangle, in Laguna de La Restinga National Park, Nueva Esparta, Venezuela.] Licenciate’s Thesis, Universidad Central de Venezuela, Caracas, Venezuela.
 Ramírez, I. 2002. Taxonomía de Esponjas (Porifera: Demospongiae) de la Laguna de Bocaripo, Estado Sucre, e Islote Caribe, Dependencia Federal, Venezuela. [Taxonomy of the Sponges (Porifera: Demospongiae) of Bocaripo Lagoon, Estado Sucre, and Caribe Island, Dependencia Federal, Venezuela.] Licenciate’s Thesis, Universidad de Oriente, Cumaná.

External links
  M. Cristina Diaz and Klaus Rützler. 2001: Sponges: an essential component of  Caribbean coral reefs. Bulletin of Marine Science, 69(2): 535–546
 World Register of Marine Species (Worms)
 World Porifera database

Videos
 Diving Los Roques HD / Buceo Los Roques HD / Mergulho Los Roques HD

Venezuela, List
 Poriferans
Sponges
Lists of invertebrates